50 pientä minuuttia is a Finnish television series. It first aired on Finnish TV in 1967 and lasted aired in 1971 .

Cast
Spede Pasanen
Simo Salminen
Risto Aaltonen
Pentti Siimes
Marjatta Raita
Vesa-Matti Loiri
Heikki Kuvaja
Pekka Laiho
Raimo Virtanen

See also
List of Finnish television series

References

External links
 

Finnish television shows
1960s Finnish television series
1970s Finnish television series
1967 Finnish television series debuts
1971 Finnish television series endings
1967 in Finnish television
MTV3 original programming